The Staten Island Ferry Disaster Memorial Museum is a non-existent museum and hoax created by artist Joe Reginella, who also designed a memorial sculpture to commemorate a fake attack by a gigantic octopus on the Staten Island Ferry.

References

External links

 

Hoaxes in the United States
Monuments and memorials in Manhattan
Outdoor sculptures in New York City
Staten Island Ferry
Nonexistent things